NTV was a general entertainment channel operated by the Sri Lanka Rupavahini Corporation.

History
NTV began broadcasting in November 2009 amidst controversy from Sri Lankan netizens due to limited coverage and lack of carriage by Dialog TV.

The channel rebranded in 2013, in time for the 2013 CHOGM.

The channel didn't make any original content, however there where cartoons produced by "Marathon" telecasted including Code Lyoko, Team Galaxy, Galactic Football, Totally Spies etc. The schedule consisted of shows that weren't airing on the other SLRC channels, accompanied by some of Channel Eye's productions. It closed down in February 2015.

References

External links 
 NTV

English-language television stations in Sri Lanka
Sri Lanka Rupavahini Corporation
Television channels and stations established in 2009
Television channels and stations disestablished in 2015